Tyson Fury vs. Deontay Wilder III (billed as "Once And For All") was a professional boxing trilogy fight between WBC and The Ring heavyweight champion, Tyson Fury, and former WBC heavyweight champion, Deontay Wilder. The bout took place at T-Mobile Arena in Paradise, Nevada on October 9, 2021. The fight, which Fury won via eleventh-round knockout, was widely regarded as the best fight of the year and one of the greatest heavyweight fights of all time, winning the award for The Ring magazine Fight of the Year 2021.

Background

Fury and Wilder first fought in December 2018, with the bout ending in a controversial draw. The pair had a rematch in February 2020, with Fury emerging victorious via seventh-round technical knockout to capture the WBC and vacant Ring magazine heavyweight titles. Wilder initiated a contractual rematch clause in March, with the bout initially being scheduled for July 18. However, due to Wilder still recovering from surgery and concerns over the COVID-19 pandemic, the bout was postponed to October. The date was again pushed back to December due to the COVID-19 lockdown restrictions that would limit fan attendance. After ESPN was unwilling to televise the bout as the event would conflict with their NFL schedule, it was suggested the date be pushed back for a third time. Upon hearing the news, Fury announced that he was walking away from the fight, stating, "they asked me if I would agree to push it to December. I agreed to Dec. 19. Then they tried to change the date again into next year. I've been training. I'm ready. When they tried moving off Dec. 19 and pushing to next year, enough was enough. I've moved on." Wilder responded to the comments by releasing a video on social media, accusing Fury of cheating in their February 2020 fight.

With Fury's team insisting the rematch clause had now expired, and Wilder's team insisting the opposite, the teams entered into a mediation process in an attempt to solve the issue, with a legally binding outcome being decided by an arbitration judge. In the meantime, Fury entered negotiations for a unification bout with reigning WBA (Super), IBF and WBO champion, Anthony Joshua. Following months of negotiations between the promoters of Fury and Joshua, an official announcement was said to be imminent. However, on May 17, 2021, it was announced that the arbitration judge had ruled in Wilder's favor, ordering Fury to face Wilder no later than September 15. 

Following the arbitration decision, Fury's co-promoter, Bob Arum, revealed a targeted date of July 24, at T-Mobile Arena in Las Vegas. The fight was postponed after Fury tested positive for COVID-19 in July 2021. The new date was announced as October 9, 2021. Both men weighed in at their respective career-heaviest weights, with the champion Fury weighing in at 277 lbs, and the challenger Wilder at 238 lbs.

Fight recap 

Wilder started the fight as the aggressor, jabbing Fury to the body and landing several clean right hands to his chest and stomach in the first round, which all three judges scored for Wilder. In the second, Fury began landing shots of his own and pushed Wilder backwards as the champion looked to establish himself in the fight. Towards the end of the third round, Fury caught Wilder with a right hook to the temple followed by a right uppercut in the clinch, which sent Wilder to the canvas. He made it to his feet and survived the round. As Fury sought to pile on the pressure against Wilder in the fourth round, Wilder landed a left jab followed by a straight right hand to Fury's left temple, stunning the champion and knocking him down. Fury made it to his feet but was floored once more after Wilder connected with a short right hook to behind Fury's ear.
Fury beat the count again, and the bell to end the round sounded soon after. At the beginning of the fifth, Wilder swung heavily at Fury, but the challenger was unable to land any telling blows. Fury then began to reassert himself, and took control of the fight in rounds six, seven, eight, and nine, outstriking Wilder and wobbling him with a number of heavy shots as the challenger began to appear fatigued. In round ten, Fury landed another heavy right hand that sent Wilder sprawling to the canvas for the second time in the fight. Wilder made it to his feet and saw the end of the round. Fury applied more forward pressure in the eleventh round, as he hurt Wilder repeatedly at range and in the clinch. Nearing a minute into the round, Fury landed a clean right hand to Wilder's temple, causing the challenger to collapse to the floor. Referee Russell Mora immediately called a stop to the bout, securing a knockout victory for the defending champion Fury.

Aftermath 

After the fight, Fury went over to Wilder and attempted to shake his hand. Wilder rebuffed the attempt and refused to acknowledge Fury. In his post-fight interview, Fury stated "I'm a sportsman. I went over to him to show some love and respect and he didn't show it back. I will pray for him so that God will soften his heart." Fury then added that it "was a great fight tonight, worthy of the best of trilogies." Praise for the fight was immediate and profuse, with fans and pundits describing it as one of the greatest heavyweight bouts in history. Promoter Bob Arum stated he had "never seen a heavyweight fight as magnificent as this" during his 57-year career in boxing.

The WBC ruled that if the winner of the fight doesn't unify with Oleksandr Usyk next, the victor will be ordered to defend the title against Dillian Whyte, the long-standing WBC No. 1 contender. Fury as the victor ultimately defended his WBC and Ring world titles against Whyte on April 23, 2022, winning the bout via sixth-round technical knockout.

Fight card

Media coverage 
As with the second fight, the trilogy fight's pay-per-view was a joint presentation of ESPN and Fox Sports, and featured personalities from both networks. This time, Fox handled the majority of production duties for the fight; the Fox Sports PPV for Manny Pacquiao vs. Yordenis Ugás—held at T-Mobile Arena in August—was described by a Fox Sports executive as having been a  "dress rehearsal" for Fury-Wilder III.

Viewership
At a cost of $79.99, the bout generated around 600,000 pay-per-view buys in the United States and around 300,000 buys overseas.

Notes

References

Boxing matches
Boxing matches involving Tyson Fury
Events in Paradise, Nevada
2021 in boxing
2021 in sports in Nevada
October 2021 sports events in the United States
Sports events postponed due to the COVID-19 pandemic
World Boxing Council heavyweight championship matches
Simulcasts